Carlos Gálviz (born 27 October 1989) is a Venezuelan racing cyclist, who currently rides for UCI Continental team . He rode at the 2014 UCI Road World Championships in the road race. In 2014, he was the national individual time trial champion of Venezuela.

Major results

2008
 8th Overall Doble Sucre Potosí GP Cemento Fancesa
 10th Overall Vuelta al Táchira
2009
 2nd Time trial, National Road Championships
2010
 2nd Overall Vuelta a Bolivia
 4th Overall Vuelta a Guatemala
1st Stage 12 (ITT)
 5th Overall Vuelta a Venezuela
 7th Overall Vuelta al Táchira
2012
 3rd Time trial, National Road Championships
 8th Overall Vuelta al Táchira
 10th Overall Vuelta del Uruguay
2013
 2nd Time trial, National Road Championships
 3rd Overall Vuelta al Táchira
2014
 Central American and Caribbean Games
1st  Road race
8th Time trial
 1st  Time trial, National Road Championships
 1st Overall Vuelta al Táchira
 2nd Overall Vuelta a Venezuela
1st Stage 6
 4th Overall Vuelta a la Independencia Nacional
1st Stage 5
 7th Time trial, Pan American Road Championships
 9th Time trial, South American Games
2015
 6th Overall Vuelta al Táchira
1st Stage 5
 10th Time trial, Pan American Road Championships
2018
 2nd Time trial, National Road Championships
 8th Overall Vuelta a Venezuela
2019
 2nd Time trial, National Road Championships
 2nd Overall Vuelta a Venezuela
 2nd Overall Vuelta a Miranda
2020
 1st  Time trial, National Road Championships
 10th Overall Vuelta al Táchira

References

External links

1989 births
Living people
Venezuelan male cyclists
Place of birth missing (living people)
20th-century Venezuelan people
21st-century Venezuelan people
Competitors at the 2014 Central American and Caribbean Games